Raidighi Assembly constituency is a Legislative Assembly constituency of South 24 Parganas district in the Indian State of West Bengal.

Overview
As per order of the Delimitation Commission in respect of the Delimitation of constituencies in the West Bengal, Raidighi Assembly constituency is composed of the following:
 Abad Bhagabanpur, Debipur, Krishna Chandrapur, Lalpur, Sankarpur and Nalua gram panchayats of Mathurapur I community development block
 Mathurapur II community development block

Raidighi Assembly constituency is a part of No. 20 Mathurapur (Lok Sabha constituency).

Members of Legislative Assembly

Election Results

Legislative Assembly Election 2021

Legislative Assembly Election 2016

Legislative Assembly Election 2011

References

Notes

Citations

Assembly constituencies of West Bengal
Politics of South 24 Parganas district